The 2019 World RX of Abu Dhabi was the first round of the sixth season of the FIA World Rallycross Championship. The event was held at the Yas Marina Circuit in Yas Island, Abu Dhabi, United Arab Emirates.

Supercar 

Source

Heats 

 Note: Timmy Hansen was forced to withdraw from the event following damage sustained to his roll cage in his Q3 crash with Bakkerud.

Semi-finals 

 Semi-Final 1

 Semi-Final 2

Final 

 Note: Niclas Grönholm originally won the event but later inherits the victory, awarded a 3-second penalty for "pushing and overtaking".

Standings after the event 

Source

 Note: Only the top five positions are included.

References 

|- style="text-align:center"
|width="35%"|Previous race:2018 World RX of South Africa
|width="40%"|FIA World Rallycross Championship2019 season
|width="35%"|Next race:2019 World RX of Catalunya
|- style="text-align:center"
|width="35%"|Previous race:-
|width="40%"|World RX of Abu Dhabi
|width="35%"|Next race:-
|- style="text-align:center"

Abu Dhabi
World RX
World RX